The University of Texas at Austin Steve Hicks School of Social Work is a division of the University of Texas at Austin in Austin, Texas. Established in 1950, the school offers programs leading to the Bachelor's in Social Work, Master of Science in Social Work, and PhD in Social Work degrees and is rated one of the top 10 social work programs in the United States. Allan H. Cole, Jr., Ph.D. is the dean of the school.

In 2017, after a donation of $25 million by telecommunications pioneer R. Steven "Steve" Hicks, the school was renamed to the Steve Hicks School of Social Work. The school is headquartered in UT's School of Social Work Building (formerly the University Junior High School).

Research 
Research projects at the UT School of Social Work are administered through The Center for Social Work Research (CSWR). The Center was founded in 1974 to provide an environment that facilitates interdisciplinary, scientifically rigorous research endeavors. Currently, the center houses 9 research institutes.

Addiction Research Institute 
This institute focuses on substance abuse among underserved populations, particularly African-Americans and Mexican-Americans. The program adopts a uniquely social work perspective, emphasizing factors at the individual, family, organizational, societal, and cultural level that influence substance abuse and substance abuse treatment.

Health Behavior and Research Training Institute 
This institute specializes in the development and implementation of interventions to address health behaviors and in the training and supervision of providers in the field who address behavior change on the front lines. Our theoretical framework is based on the Transtheoretical Model (TTM) and Motivational Interviewing (MI). Through funding primarily from the National Institutes of Health (NIH) and the Centers for Disease Control and Prevention (CDC), HBRT's intervention research focuses on fetal alcohol spectrum disorder; alcohol, cocaine, smoking, and other substance disorders; STI testing; HIV and safer sexual practices; and screening and brief motivational interventions in medical settings.

Donation and renaming 
In 2017, the School of Social Work received a large donation from telecommunications pioneer and vice chairman of the Board of Regents at the University of Texas System, R. Steven "Steve" Hicks. The announcement of this donation was made September 6, 2017, and in commemoration of the event, the university tower was lit burnt orange. The $25 million donation is to be split three ways, with $10 million going towards establishing a permanent endowment to support future scholarships, $5 million being used to match donations in an effort to encourage additional gifts, and $10 million being used to fund and enhance various aspects of the education system. Hicks, who is a business man himself with no personal background in social work, stated he made the donation in an effort "to reduce student debt burden so that social work graduates can stay in their careers doing what they love and positively affecting the lives of thousands of people."

References

External links
 

University of Texas at Austin schools, colleges, and departments
Schools of social work in the United States
1950 establishments in Texas